Clark Township, Arkansas may refer to:

 Clark Township, Clay County, Arkansas
 Clark Township, Greene County, Arkansas
 Clark Township, Logan County, Arkansas
 Clark Township, Pike County, Arkansas
 Clark Township, Pope County, Arkansas
 Clark Township, Searcy County, Arkansas

See also 
 List of townships in Arkansas
 Clark Township (disambiguation)

Arkansas township disambiguation pages